(born June 16, 1969) is a Japanese professional wrestler.

Orihara is known by his career in numerous Japanese promotions such as Michinoku Pro Wrestling, Wrestle Association R, Battlarts and Dramatic Dream Team.

Professional wrestling career
Orihara was trained in the All Japan Pro Wrestling Dojo under Genichiro Tenryu's tutelage. When Tenryu left for Super World of Sports, Orihara and others followed him to the new promotion. In 1992, Orihara was sent to Mexico, where he learnt the high-flying lucha libre style and wrestled for Consejo Mundial de Lucha Libre as Iga, a masked ninja character. Upon his return to SWS, now named Wrestle Association R, Masao showed his new style and competed in memorable cruiserweight bouts with Ultimo Dragon, with whom he formed a long friendship. After the WAR demise, Orihara landed in Michinoku Pro Wrestling, where he became Sasuke the Great, a The Great Sasuke copycat. Orihara formed a tag team with Takeshi Ono (who competed as Masked Tiger) and feuded with Sasuke and Tiger Mask. Alongside their work in Michinoku Pro, Orihara and Ono became a mainstay team on Battlarts. In 1999, Orihara competed in New Japan Pro-Wrestling and Dramatic Dream Team.

Currently, Orihara is a part of Satoru Sayama's Real Japan Pro Wrestling and Tenryu Project.

Championships and accomplishments
Consejo Mundial de Lucha Libre
CMLL Japan Tag Team Championship (1 time) – with Nosawa
Dramatic Dream Team
KO-D Openweight Championship (1 time)
Guts World Pro-Wrestling
GWC Tag Team Championship (1 time) – with Masked Mystery
GWC 6-Man Tag Team Championship (2 times) – with Dick Togo and Ryan Upin (1), Amigo Suzuki and Ryan Upin (1)
Michinoku Pro Wrestling
Apex of Triangle Championship (1 time) – with Takeshi Ono and Cow Cow
Futaritabi Tag Team League (2003) – with Dick Togo
Mobius
Apex of Triangle Championship (4 times) – with Dick Togo and Buho Mochero (2), Nobutaka Moribe and El Jalapeño (2) 
Pro Wrestling Illustrated
PWI ranked him # 47 of the best 500 singles wrestlers in the PWI 500 in 2000
Real Japan Pro Wrestling
Legend Championship (1 time)
Tenryu Project
Tenryu Proyect International Junior Heavyweight Championship (1 time)
Tenryu Project International Junior Heavyweight Tag Team Championship (2 times) – with Black Tiger V (1) and Hiroki (1, current)
Tokyo Sports
Rookie of the Year (1991)
Universal Wrestling Association / Universal Wrestling Federation
UWA/UWF Intercontinental Tag Team Championship (1 time) – with The Great Sasuke
Wrestling Entertainment Wrestling
Apex of Triangle Championship (1 time) – with Dick Togo and Kintaro Kanemura
Wrestling and Romance
WAR International Junior Heavyweight Championship (1 time)
Wrestling Observer Newsletter
Best Wrestling Maneuver (1991) Moonsault to the outside of the ring

References

Japanese male professional wrestlers
1969 births
Living people
People from Gunma Prefecture
20th-century professional wrestlers
21st-century professional wrestlers
KO-D Openweight Champions
International Junior Heavyweight Tag Team Champions
Tenryu Project International Junior Heavyweight Champions